Nicolas Archer (born 30 August 1955) is an English former first-class cricketer. He was a right-handed batsman and a right-arm medium-pace bowler who played for Staffordshire. He was born in Walsall.

Archer made his Minor Counties Championship debut the week before his 18th birthday, though he would not make another appearance in the competition for five years. He made his List A debut during the 1984 season, and made a single List A appearance in every season up to 1995, as Staffordshire lost every one of their first-round NatWest Trophy matches of that period.

A lower-middle order batsman, Archer remained the team's captain from his second to his final match, wherein that time he became their highest run-scorer with a run total of 10,651 runs.

Archer also held a great passion for rugby, where he played as a fly-half for Walsall and later moved on to Mosley rugby.

To this day he is currently still working in cricket as the general manager of the BDCL (Birmingham district cricket league) and is in his fourth year as chairman of the national counties prior to this he did a stint as his beloved Staffordshire crickets chairman and before that 10 years as secretary.

References

1955 births
Living people
English cricketers
Staffordshire cricketers
Staffordshire cricket captains
Sportspeople from Walsall